is a public university in Sasebo, Nagasaki, Japan.  The school was established in 2008 as a result of merger of Siebold University of Nagasaki and Nagasaki Prefectural University.

References

External links

 Official website 

Educational institutions established in 2008
Public universities in Japan
University
2008 establishments in Japan